Nunathloogagamiutbingoi Dunes is the name of a beach on the southeastern coast of Nunivak Island in Bethel Census Area, Alaska. 

Summer temperatures in the area are frequently , and the night is commonly . There is little precipitation; the month of August is the wettest, while March is frequently the driest month.

Nunathloogagamiutbingoi has been noted for its long place name. Nunathloogagamiutbingoi Dunes was declared "most difficult to pronounce" in the state of Alaska by Reader's Digest.

References

Landforms of Bethel Census Area, Alaska
Beaches of Alaska